Muscle Shoals City School District is a school district in Colbert County, Alabama.

References

External links
 

Education in Colbert County, Alabama